Staroilikovo (İśke İlek) is a rural locality (a selo) in Kileyevsky Selsoviet, Bakalinsky District, Bashkortostan, Russia. The population was 147 as of 2010. There are 2 streets.

Geography 
Staroilikovo is located 19 km north of Bakaly (the district's administrative centre) by road. Novoilikovo is the nearest rural locality.

References 

Rural localities in Bakalinsky District